Hacılar (also, Gadzhylar and Gadzhyly) is a village in the Agdash Rayon of Azerbaijan.  The village forms part of the municipality of Yuxarı Nemətabad.

References 

Populated places in Agdash District